"Heroes Reborn" is a 1996–97 crossover story arc among comic book series published by the American company Marvel Comics. During this one-year, multi-title story arc, Marvel temporarily outsourced the production of several of its best-known comic books to the studios of artists Jim Lee and Rob Liefeld, who were among Marvel's most popular artists before leaving to form independent companies.

Publication history
Following the apparent deaths of the Avengers, the Fantastic Four, and Doctor Doom battling Onslaught in Onslaught: Marvel Universe, those characters were "reborn" and certain aspects of their earlier stories were expanded with the intent of telling their adventures anew for modern generations. This was explained, in-story, as their having been transported into a pocket universe by Franklin Richards, the near-omnipotent, psychic son of Mister Fantastic and the Invisible Woman, to save them, where they lived in the so-called "Franklin-verse", oblivious to what had happened to them. The characters' origins and histories were revised and updated circa mid-1990s for modern audiences. For instance, Ben Grimm fought as a pilot in the Gulf War instead of World War II, and Susan and Johnny Storm were explained to have been financial backers for Reed Richards' rocket, hence their presence on the mission. In addition, while Richards' goal of becoming the first man to get to Mars remained, it was revealed that he secretly aimed to explore the interstellar anomalies of that area.

For this reworking, Marvel "farmed out" the properties to some of their former freelance artists who had ceased working for the company in order to form Image Comics. Jim Lee's WildStorm Productions handled Fantastic Four and Iron Man, and Rob Liefeld's Extreme Studios took the reins of The Avengers and Captain America. However, Marvel ended Liefeld's contract early after six issues, citing low sales on his two titles. Liefeld's titles were reassigned to Lee. Walt Simonson took over Avengers when it moved to WildStorm. Although the four titles in "Heroes Reborn" were slated for a 12-issue run, James Robinson wrote a thirteenth and final issue for each book. The storyline, entitled "World War III", was a crossover between the Marvel and WildStorm characters.

The changes to the characters were controversial, provoking debates among fans. The change in creative team on Captain America was also controversial, since the pre-Heroes Reborn team of Mark Waid and Ron Garney had already been bringing increased sales and critical acclaim to the series. All of the titles experienced a large upsurge in sales. According to Lee, Marvel proposed continuing the Heroes Reborn lineup indefinitely, but under the condition that Lee would draw at least one of them; Lee refused.

At the end of the storyline, WildStorm's agreement with Marvel ended, at which point the Fantastic Four and Avengers were returned to the mainstream Marvel Universe, again through the intervention of Franklin Richards, in the storyline "Heroes Return", which included a central miniseries Heroes Reborn: The Return, by writer Peter David and artist Salvador Larocca.

Cancelled and relaunched titles
 Fantastic Four #416 – September 1996 (relaunched as Fantastic Four Vol. 2 #1)
 Avengers #402 – September 1996 (relaunched as Avengers Vol. 2 #1)
 Iron Man #332 – September 1996 (relaunched as Iron Man Vol. 2 #1)
 Captain America #454 – August 1996 (relaunched as Captain America Vol. 2 #1)
 Thor #502 – September 1996 (renamed Journey into Mystery from #503)
 Heroes Reborn 1/2 
 Avengers #1–13 
 Captain America #1–13 
 Fantastic Four #1–13 
 Iron Man #1–13 
 Marvel Spotlight Heroes Reborn/Onslaught Reborn #1 
 Heroes Reborn Ashema #1 
 Doom #1–3
 Doomsday #1 
 Masters of Evil #1 
 Rebel #1 
 Remnants #1 
 Young Allies #1 
 Heroes Reborn: The Return #1–4

"Heroes Return"
The "Heroes Reborn" was followed by "Heroes Return", which consisted of a central, four-issue miniseries, Heroes Reborn: The Return, by writer Peter David and artist Salvador Larocca (December 1997). In the story, the Celestials take notice of Franklin's pocket universe and initially demand that he eliminate one of the two universes, but eventually relent on the condition that all beings native to Earth-616 evacuate the pocket universe and never return.

The heroes are gathered in a massive ship to leave the pocket universe. Characters including She-Hulk and several members of the Inhuman Royal Family are depicted as returning heroes, even though they were not among the missing heroes from Onslaught: Marvel Universe.

As the heroes travel to their destination, Dr. Doom suddenly escapes the ship with Franklin, hoping to use the siphoning devices he created to steal Franklin's power. However, Doom is stopped by Mr. Fantastic and Thor, who rescue the boy. Thor uses his hammer to create a portal, trapping himself and Doom in it.

As soon as the remaining heroes break the boundaries between the two worlds, they all suddenly remember their past lives. Bruce Banner and the Hulk are merged back together into one singular being. The returned Anthony Stark possesses the memories of both the original and teenage Anthony Stark, and thus considers himself to be essentially both of them.

The pocket universe was then placed under the authority of Ashema the Listener. Eventually, Thor is returned to Asgard, while Doom's whereabouts are left unknown.

Cancelled and relaunched titles
 Fantastic Four Vol. 2 #13 (relaunched as Fantastic Four Vol. 3 #1 - January 1998)
 Avengers Vol. 2 #13 (relaunched as Avengers Vol. 3 #1 - February 1998)
 Iron Man Vol. 2 #13 (relaunched as Iron Man Vol. 3 #1 - February 1998)
 Captain America Vol. 2 #13 (relaunched as Captain America Vol. 3 #1 - January 1998)
 Journey into Mystery #521 (replaced by Thor Vol. 2 #1 - July 1998)
 Heroes Reborn: The Return #1-4
 Fantastic Four #1-4 
 Iron Man #1-2 
 Captain America #1-3
 Avengers #1-2 
 Thor #1

"Heroes Reborn" revisited
In 1999, Marvel collected Heroes Reborn: The Return #1-4 limited series re-titled as the Return of the Heroes trade paperback. It was re-released in 2009 as Heroes Reborn: The Return trade paperback again collecting the 4-issue mini-series, and also the Heroes Reborn one-shot specials from 2000: Doomsday #1, Ashema #1, Masters of Evil #1, Rebel #1, Remnants #1, Young Allies #1, and Doom #1.

In July 2000, Marvel published the trade paperback Fantastic Four: Heroes Reborn, collecting Fantastic Four vol. 2, issues #1-6 under the 'Marvel's Finest' banner, but no other "Heroes Reborn" reprints followed for some time.

With 2006 marking the 10th anniversary of the "Heroes Reborn" crossover, Marvel marked the occasion by having the reality-traversing Exiles team visit the "Heroes Reborn" Earth, in Exiles #81-82. The company also announced it was reprinting original "Heroes Reborn" series and produced trade paperbacks collecting issues 1-12 (excluding the series finale cross-over "World War III") of the four titles. A new edition of Heroes Reborn: Fantastic Four trade paperback was released in August 2018 . Also, Marvel announced that Jeph Loeb and Rob Liefeld would reunite in November 2006 for Onslaught Reborn, a five-part weekly limited series that would feature both Onslaught and a world similar to the "Heroes Reborn" universe. This was planned to tie in with the memorial scholarship fund established in honor of Loeb's son Sam.

In 2021, Marvel published a Heroes Reborn storyline consisting of a central miniseries by Jason Aaron and Ed McGuinness, though it bears no relationship to the 1996 story beyond its title and some in-story references.

Collected editions
Return of the Heroes - collects Heroes Reborn: The Return #1-4 (1999)
Fantastic Four: Heroes Reborn TPB (Trade Paperback) - collects Fantastic Four vol. 2 #1-6 (2000)
Heroes Reborn: Avengers TPB - collects Avengers vol. 2 #1-12 (2006)
Heroes Reborn: Captain America TPB - collects Captain America vol. 2 #1-12 (2006)
Heroes Reborn: Fantastic Four TPB - collects Fantastic Four vol. 2 #1-12 (2006); second edition (August 2018)
Heroes Reborn: Iron Man TPB - collects Iron Man vol. 2 #1-12 (2006)
Heroes Reborn: The Return TPB - collects Heroes Return #1-4, Doomsday #1, Ashema #1, Masters of Evil #1, Rebel #1, Remnants #1, Young Allies #1, and Doom #1. (2009)
Onslaught Reborn TPB - collects Onslaught Reborn #1-5 (2008)

References

External links

1997 comics debuts
Marvel Comics limited series
Comics by Jim Lee